Moose Jaw—Lake Centre was a federal electoral district in Saskatchewan, Canada, that was represented in the House of Commons of Canada from 1953 to 1968 and from 1988 to 1997.

This riding was created in 1953 from parts of Lake Centre, Moose Jaw, Qu'Appelle, and Rosthern ridings

It was abolished in 1966 when it was redistributed into Moose Jaw, Regina East and Regina—Lake Centre ridings.

It was re-created in 1987 from parts of Assiniboia, Humboldt—Lake Centre and Moose Jaw ridings.

The electoral district was abolished in 1996 when it was redistributed into Blackstrap, Cypress Hills—Grasslands,  Palliser and Regina—Arm River ridings.

Members of Parliament
This riding has elected the following Members of Parliament:

Election results

1953-1968

1988 - 1997

See also 
 List of Canadian federal electoral districts
 Past Canadian electoral districts

External links 
 
 

Former federal electoral districts of Saskatchewan